The Zambian Army, is the land military branch of the Zambian Defence Force. Like all branches of the Zambian military, citizens of the nation are required to register at 16 years old, and citizens can join at 16 years old with parental consent or at 18 years old when they are classified as adults by Zambia. There is currently no conscription. (There was a Zambia National Defence Force conscription from 1975 to 1980.) Applicants must be Zambian citizens and must have a school Grade 12 certification. Applicants must also undergo a test for HIV on enlistment. Personnel can serve until age 55, when there is a mandatory retirement. Its first Commander  Major General  was Michael Grigg, appointed by Kenneth Kaunda. The first local Commander was Gen Kingsley Chinkuli. According to the 2014 CIA World Factbook:
There are 3,041,069 men between 16-49 who are classified as manpower (this does not mean that all of them are fit for duty), and 2,948,291 women between 16–49 who are classified as manpower. This makes a total of 5,989,360 people classified as manpower. 
There are 1,745,656 men who are classified as fit for military service between the ages of 16–49. There are 1,688,670 women who are classified as fit for military service between the ages of 16–49. Therefore, Zambia has 3,434,326 people fit for military service between the ages of 16–49.
1.55% of the GDP of Zambia is spent on the military, ranked 70th in the world.

Organisation 
The current Army organisation is as follows:

Three infantry brigades:

 1 Brigade (Lusaka)
 2 Brigade (Kabwe) 
 3 Brigade (Ndola) 

With the following units:
 64th Armoured Tank Regiment (tank). 
 17th Cavalry Regiment (armoured reconnaissance) 
 10th Medium Artillery Regiment
 2 Artillery Battalions  
 Multiple Rocket Launchers Battalion
 1 Engineer Regiment, Mufulira
 6 Construction Regiment
 Mechanised battalion
 Zambia Regiment (raised in 1964 from the Northern Rhodesia Regiment)
 Light Infantry
 1st Battalion
 2nd Battalion
 3rd Battalion
 4th Battalion
 5th Battalion
 6th Battalion
 Reserve Infantry
 7th Battalion
 8th Battalion
 9th Battalion
 1 Commando Battalion 
 48th Marine Unit
 Specialist schools

Equipment

Small arms

 RPG-7
 FN FAL
 Heckler & Koch G3
 Galil Sniper
 AKM
 IWI ACE
 IWI Tavor
 AK-47
 Sterling submachine gun
 DShK
 PK machine gun

Vehicles and artillery

References

Military of Zambia
Armies by country